Neufchâteau is a city and municipality of Wallonia located in the province of Luxembourg, Belgium.

On 1 January 2018 the municipality, which covers 113.79 km² (44 sq. mi.), had 7,679 inhabitants, giving a population density of 67 inhabitants per km² (174 per sq. mi.).

The municipality consists of the following districts: Grandvoir, Grapfontaine, Hamipré, Longlier, Neufchâteau, and Tournay.

Other localities are: Cousteumont, Fineuse, Gérimont, Harfontaine, Hosseuse, Lahérie, LeSart, Malome, Marbay, Massul, Molinfaing, MonIdée, Montplainchamps, Morival, Namoussart, Nolinfaing, Offaing, Petitvoir, Respelt, Semel, Tronquoy, Verlaine, and Warmifontaine.

History

Early history
A Neolithic megalith dating from about 2000 BC and a Celtic necropolis dating from between the 5th and 2nd centuries BC have been found in this area, attesting to early human activity.  Gallo-Roman sepultures and a small Roman villa were found here as well, showing the presence around the 2nd century AD of a minor agricultural domain.  The region was used in Carolingian times mostly as a hunting area and population remained sparse throughout the Middle Ages.  A document dating from 1100 shows that one of the many tiny hamlets in the area, Semel, was donated to the Abbey of Amdain (currently Saint-Hubert). In 1239, that same hamlet was mentioned as being part of the lordship of Neufchâteau, at the time when it was now given to the Orval Abbey.  Like many of its neighbours, the lordship of Neufchâteau was part of the Duchy of Luxembourg.

17th century until now
An important document for the history of the Neufchâteau region is a 1609 painting entitled "LA TERRE ET PREVOSTEE DE NEVFCHASTEAV AVECQZ SES DESPENDENCES", now kept in the Arlon archives.  The painting shows the town of Neufchâteau within its protective walls, at the foot of its castle, surrounded by a number of villages and hamlets.  In the mid-17th century, the plague and Louis XIV’s wars decimated the area.  After the French Revolution and until 1815, Neufchâteau became the chief town of the old French département of Forêts. During World War I, its governor, Count Hans von Blumenthal, was one of a small number of German military officials who struck up a rapport with the local population, chiefly through his interest in hunting.  Fighting in the area, however, was heavy, as more than 200 soldiers lost their lives in the first month of the war.

The cell biologist and Nobel Prizewinner Albert Claude was born in Longlier, close to Neufchâteau, in 1899.

Sights

The city hall, law courts, and main church
The Griffon tower, last remnant of the medieval castle that gave the city its name
The rural-life museum
Lake Neufchâteau

Climate

References

Gourdet L. and Geubel A., Histoire du Pays de Neufchâteau, Gembloux, 1956, 467 p., in-8º, cited in :fr:Carte d'Arenberg de la Prévôté de Neufchâteau en 1609.

External links

Official city web site (in French)

 
Cities in Wallonia
Municipalities of Luxembourg (Belgium)